Anișoara Oprea (born 12 February 1977) is a Romanian diver. She competed at the 1996 Summer Olympics and the 2000 Summer Olympics.

References

1977 births
Living people
Romanian female divers
Olympic divers of Romania
Divers at the 1996 Summer Olympics
Divers at the 2000 Summer Olympics
Sportspeople from Bacău